The 2012 IAAF World Race Walking Cup was held in Saransk, Russia, on 12–13 May 2012. The track of the Cup runs in the central streets of the city.
Detailed reports on the event and an appraisal of the results was given for the IAAF.

Complete results were published.

Medallists

Results

Men's 20 km

*: beyond Time Limit
IAAF Rule 230.6(a): repeated failure to comply with the definition of race walking
IAAF Rule 32.2(a): presence of a Prohibited Substance or its Metabolites or Markers in the Athlete's Sample
 The original bronze medallist Vladimir Kanaykin and ninth-placer Valeriy Borchin were both disqualified for doping

Team (Men 20 km)

Men's 50 km

*: beyond Time Limit
IAAF Rule 230.6(a): repeated failure to comply with the definition of race walking
IAAF Rule 32.2(a): presence of a Prohibited Substance or its Metabolites or Markers in the Athlete's Sample
 Original Gold Medallist Sergey Kirdyapkin and fourth-placer Sergey Bakulin had their times and placings annulled due to doping violations.

Team (Men 50 km)

Men's 10 km (Junior)

IAAF Rule 230.6(a): repeated failure to comply with the definition of race walking

Team (Men 10 km Junior)

Women's 20 km

*: beyond Time Limit
IAAF Rule 230.6(a): repeated failure to comply with the definition of race walking
IAAF Rule 32.2(a): presence of a Prohibited Substance or its Metabolites or Markers in the Athlete's Sample
 The original silver medallist Olga Kaniskina had her performance annulled due to doping.

Team (Women 20 km)

Women's 10 km (Junior)

Team (Women 10 km Junior)

Medal table

 Note: Totals include both individual and team medals, with medals in the team competition counting as one medal.

Participation
The participation of 475 athletes from 62 countries was officially announced.  An unofficial count yields the participation of only 449 athletes from 61 countries.  The announced athlete from Nigeria did not appear in the result lists.

  (3)
  (2)
  (16)
  (20)
  (2)
  (8)
  (2)
  (7)
  (2)
  (20)
  (14)
  (1)
  (2)
  (7)
  (16)
  (4)
  (1)
  (3)
  (7)
  (16)
  (9)
  (7)
  (1)
  (11)
  (10)
  (2)
  (11)
  (18)
  (6)
  (8)
  (6)
  (1)
  (6)
  (1)
  (1)
  (16)
  (2)
  (1)
  (2)
  (1)
  (2)
  (21)
  (16)
  (7)
  (21)
  (3)
  (1)
  (2)
  (1)
  (6)
  (5)
  (20)
  (3)
  (3)
  (2)
  (4)
  (10)
  (21)
  (10)
  (17)
  (1)

See also
 2012 Race Walking Year Ranking

References

External links
 Events's Webpage
 IAAF WORLD RACE WALKING CUP – SARANSK 2012 – FACTS & FIGURES

World Athletics Race Walking Team Championships
World Race Walking Cup
World Race Walking Cup
International athletics competitions hosted by Russia